Riri-tuna-rai is the goddess of the coconut in the mythology of Easter Island. She is married to Atua-metua.

References 
 Robert D. Craig: Dictionary of Polynesian Mythology, 1989

Rapa Nui goddesses

Coconuts
Nature goddesses
Tree goddesses